The 1977 season was the first in the National Soccer League for Mooroolbark Soccer Club. In addition to the domestic league, they also participated in the NSL Cup. Mooroolbark finished 14th to be relegated in their National Soccer League season, and were eliminated in the NSL Cup second round by Fitzroy United.

Players

Competitions

Overview

National Soccer League

League table

Results summary

Results by round

Matches

NSL Cup

Statistics

Appearances and goals
Includes all competitions. Players with no appearances not included in the list.

Disciplinary record
Includes all competitions. The list is sorted by squad number when total cards are equal. Players with no cards not included in the list.

Clean sheets
Includes all competitions. The list is sorted by squad number when total clean sheets are equal. Numbers in parentheses represent games where both goalkeepers participated and both kept a clean sheet; the number in parentheses is awarded to the goalkeeper who was substituted on, whilst a full clean sheet is awarded to the goalkeeper who was on the field at the start of play. Goalkeepers with no clean sheets not included in the list.

References

Mooroolbark SC seasons
Mooroolbark